Bryan Stanyon, also known as Bryan Stanion, is a British actor with a career spanning from the 1960s through the late 1970s.  He is perhaps best known for his portrayal as Professor Cawston in the British science fiction serial The Tomorrow People.  Stanyon's character was one of the few recurring roles for a non-regular character in the series.

Radio
Stanyon spent his early career in radio, with one of his first billets as "Tom Midway" in the 1964 BBC radio show "Repertory in Britain", in the segment "Semi-Detached".  In 1967, Stanyon played the voice role of "Peter" in the radio show "Thirty Minute Theatre".  In 1970, he starred as "Teddy" in the Afternoon Theater production of "Stay Where You Are".

Film and television
One of Stanyon's more well known roles is that of Professor Cawston, in The Tomorrow People, in which Stanyon portrays a professor of psionics who occasionally assists the homo superiors known as the Tomorrow People.  Stanyon's first appearance was in the Tomorrow People serial "A Rift in Time", in which his character was first introduced.  The serial aired in the spring of 1974, with Stanyon returning to the same role a year later for the serial "Secret Weapon", co-starring Trevor Bannister as an evil Colonel attempting to use the Tomorrow People as spies in the Cold War.  Later that year, Stanyon appeared in his final serial of the Tomorrow People, in "Revenge of Jedikiah".

Other works include the 1967 film Stranger in the House, a 1967 production of Henry IV as well as roles in the productions of Child Marlene, and the 1972 production Wine and Retribution.

From 1973 to 1977, Stanyon appeared as a judge in the British series Crown Court''.

References

External links
Radiography of Bryan Stanyon

British actors
Possibly living people
Year of birth missing